Hajj Rajab (also Romanized as Ḩājj Rajab; also known as Ḩājjī Rajab and Kalāteh-ye Ḩājjī Rajab) is a village in Qaleh-ye Bala Rural District, in the Farah Dasht District of Kashmar County, Razavi Khorasan Province, Iran. At the 2006 census, its population was 135, in 30 families.

References 

Populated places in Kashmar County